The 1961 Campeonato Centroamericano was the second edition of the first attempt in an international tournament for the CONCACAF region. All teams that participated were champions of their respective leagues. The tournament was composed of Central American and Caribbean clubs with four from Central America and one from Caribbean. Unlike the 1959 edition, the 1961 edition did not involve North American clubs but instead the Central American champion from the four-team playoff would face off against the Caribbean club.

Teams

Central America
 Águila
 Alajuelense
 Comunicaciones
 Olimpia

Caribbean
 Jong Holland

Matches

Central American Championship

Semifinals

Finals

Grand Final

References

External links 
 CONCACAF Official Site

Campeonato Centroamericano
1961 in CONCACAF football